Nina Howell Starr (1903–2000) was an American photographer, art historian, and art dealer. She is known for her influence in the career of artist Minnie Evans, and her photo-documentation of American roadside attractions and folk art culture.

Early life and education 
She was born Cornelia Margaret Howell in 1903 in Newark, New Jersey. Her sister was Jane Howell Lovejoy, former president of the Detroit Board of Education and a former governor of Wayne State University.

Starr briefly attended Wellesley College, and she graduated in 1926 from Barnard College. The summer after graduation, she married professor Nathan Comfort Starr (1896–1981), he specialized in Arthurian literature and Arthurian legends. Her sister-in-law was artist Ruth Starr Rose. Nathan and Nina had four children together, one son and three daughters. In the 1930s, she continued her studies and took architecture courses at Bennington College in Vermont.

The couple initially settled down in Cambridge, Massachusetts for her husband's academic career, but they later moved to Williamstown, Massachusetts; Annapolis, Maryland; Winter Park, Florida; Gainesville, Florida; New York City; and Hamden, Connecticut. In 1952–1953, Nathan Comfort Starr was a Fulbright Visiting Scholar at Kansai University in Osaka, Japan and Nina joined him in the travels.

In 1963, at the age of 60 she received her MFA degree in photography from the University of Florida, studying under Van Deren Coke and Jerry Uelsmann.

Career 
Starr was opinionated and advocated for modern design, racial equality, etiquette, the English language, folk art, women's rights, and photography, amongst other things. She would often write to newspapers to express her ideas. She became interested in photography at the age of 53.

In 1962, Starr had heard of self-taught artist Minnie Evans, and Starr visited Evan's place of work at the Airlie Gardens in North Carolina. Evans was working at the gardens when they met, and since 1948 Evans had displayed her artwork near her work station. Starr became Evan's representative and publicist for the next 25 years- she arranged and organized Evan's art exhibitions, taped interviews with the artist, she set Evan's art sales prices, and more. In the 1960s, Starr helped launch Evan's career with her first New York City art exhibition. Starr was instrumental in arranging a 1975 solo exhibition of Evan's drawings at the Whitney Museum of American Art, where Starr served as a guest curator, and she helped publish the related exhibition catalogue.

Starr's photography became known in the 1970s when she was in her 70s, while living in New York City.

Death 
She died on May 14, 2000 at the age of 97, in her home in Hamden, Connecticut. Her funeral services were at St. James' Episcopal Church in Manhattan.

In 2015, she had a posthumous solo exhibition, The New Yorker Project at Institute 193 in New York City.

Publications

See also 

 Women in the art history field

References

External links 
Nina Howell Starr papers, 1933–1996, Archives of American Art, Smithsonian Institution
Nina Howell Starr in the Barnard Digital Collection from Barnard College

1903 births
2000 deaths
American photographers
Women art historians
American women curators
American curators
People from Hamden, Connecticut
People from Newark, New Jersey
Barnard College alumni
Bennington College alumni
University of Florida alumni
20th-century American women